Pilat is a surname in central Europe.

Pilat may also refer to:
 Mont Pilat, a mountainous area in the east of the Massif Central of France
 Pilat Regional Natural Park, a protected area of Mont Pilat in southeastern France
 "Pilat" (Maalaala Mo Kaya), an episode of the drama anthology Maalaala Mo Kaya

See also 
 
 Pilate (disambiguation)
 Pilati (disambiguation)
 Pilatus (disambiguation)